Mairs is a surname. Notable people with the surname include:

Clara Mairs (1878–1963), American painter and printmaker
Gregory Mairs (born 1994), British badminton player
Nancy Mairs (1943–2016), American author

See also
Mair (surname)
Mars (surname)